Borislav Vasilev (born 15 August 1951) is a Bulgarian rower. He competed in the men's coxless four event at the 1972 Summer Olympics.

References

1951 births
Living people
Bulgarian male rowers
Olympic rowers of Bulgaria
Rowers at the 1972 Summer Olympics
Rowers from Sofia